Kuryłówka  is a village in Leżajsk County, Subcarpathian Voivodeship, in south-eastern Poland. It is the seat of the gmina (administrative district) called Gmina Kuryłówka. The village is located in the historical region Galicia.

The village has a population of 1,711. It was first mentioned in 1515, although the settlement in this place already existed in Roman times. In 1978, Aleksandra Gruszczyńska from the District Museum in Rzeszów conducted archaeological research during which the remains of a settlement from the Roman period were discovered. June 29, 1944 invasion of Kalmyks.
It was the site of anti-communist resistance after World War II (see: Battle of Kurylowka). In 2007 it was damaged by a waterspout.

Transportation
Voivodeship road 877 passes through Kuryłówka.

Notable people
Tomasz Czapla
Janusz Dolny
Roman Szczęsny
Antoni Wyspiański

References

Villages in Leżajsk County